The Mounted Atatürk Monument  is as equestrian statue of Atatürk by Gürdal Duyar that was erected in 1974 on the Republic Square in Kayseri. It was covered in a tarp for years and was later moved to the Kültürpark.

References

Sources
 
 
 
 
 

Kayseri
Kayseri
Buildings and structures completed in 1974
Equestrian statues in Turkey
1974 sculptures
Sculptures by Gürdal Duyar